The AK-101 is an assault rifle of the Kalashnikov series. It's marketed at those looking for a weapon that combines the logistical compatibility and familiarity of the 5.56×45mm NATO round with the reliability of a Kalashnikov. The design of this rifle is similar to the AK-74. 

It is designed with modern and composite materials, including plastics that reduce weight and improve accuracy. Many of the improvements found in the AK-101 are also present in the AK-103 and the rest of the AK-100 series of rifles. The AK-101 is also considered to be an export version of the AK-74M.

Design
The AK-101 is a selective fire weapon that can be fired in either semi-automatic or fully automatic mode. The disassembly procedure for the AK-101 is identical to that of the AK-74. The AK-101 has an attachment rail installed on the side of the receiver for mounting scopes and other optical sights, which will accept most types of Russian and European AK optics. The rifle accepts most synthetic and metal AK-74-style magazines with 30-round capacity. The AK-101 has a  barrel with an AK-74 style muzzle brake attached to the barrel to control muzzle climb.

The AK-101 is chambered in 5.56mm NATO and features a black glass-filled polyamide side folding stock, which folds to the left. The side folding stock looks similar to a normal fixed stock, but folds and locks securely to the left side of the receiver. It has a cutout to compensate for the side rail.

Variants

Norinco AK-2000
Norinco produced a copy of the AK-101 as the AK-2000, with the stock of the Type 56-2. It has been in service with Indonesian police units.

KR-101
A clone of the AK-101 made by Kalashnikov-USA.

Users

: Used by Mobile Brigade Corps, Detachment 88 and Indonesian Marine Corps

Gallery

References

External links
 In depth information about the Kalashnikov 100 series

5.56×45mm NATO assault rifles
Assault rifles of Russia
Kalashnikov derivatives
Kalashnikov Concern products
Weapons and ammunition introduced in 1995